Laidley-Summers-Quarrier House, also known as Glenwood, is a historic home located at Charleston, West Virginia.  It is a two-story gable roofed dwelling in the Greek Revival style and built in 1852.

It was listed on the National Register of Historic Places in 1978.

References

External links

Houses in Charleston, West Virginia
Greek Revival houses in West Virginia
Houses completed in 1852
Houses on the National Register of Historic Places in West Virginia
National Register of Historic Places in Charleston, West Virginia
Historic American Buildings Survey in West Virginia
1852 establishments in Virginia